Sarn may refer to:

Fiction 
Admiral Sarn, a fictional character in the game Rebel Assault II
Precious Bane (French title: Sarn), a novel by Mary Webb

Places 
Sarn, Bridgend, Wales, a village 
Sarn railway station
Sarn, Flintshire, Wales; a UK location
Sarn, Powys, Wales, a village 
Sarn, Switzerland, a former municipality

Other
Sarn (Martian crater)
Amélie Sarn, French writer

See also

Sarna (disambiguation)